DPAG is an acronym and can mean:
 Dunedin Public Art Gallery
 Deutsche Post AG, a logistics group based in Germany
 Deutsche Petroleum-Aktiengesellschaft